Mucobromic acid is an organic compound that consists of a dibrominated alkene with aldehyde and carboxylic acid functional groups. It easily tautomerizes to a furanone hemiacetal form. This compound, and the analogous mucochloric acid (CAS #87-56-9), form the group of known mucohalic acids. The bromide appears to behave similarly to the more heavily studied chloride.

Synthesis and structure
Mucobromic acid can be synthesized by bromination of furfural via an oxidation/decarboxylation process:

C4H4OCHO  +  3 Br2  +  3 H2O   →  C2Br2CHO(CO2H)  +  CO2  +  8 HBr

Mucobromic acid exists as a mixture acyclic and cyclic isomers. The compound can be reduced using sodium borohydride to give the lactone.

Hydrolysis under basic conditions of either the chloro or bromo compound involves substitution of the halide adjacent to the acid. The resulting mucoxyhalic acids exist as a mixture of keto and enol forms. The reaction occurs via a conjugate addition/elimination of the alkene–aldehyde part of the structure.

Hazards
Mucohalic acids have received attention since they are products of the halogenation of biomass. They are genotoxins and potential carcinogens.  They have the ability to alkylate certain DNA bases, specifically guanosine, adenosine, and cytosine.

References

Organobromides